Pidge may refer to:

Nickname:
 Noah Beery Jr. (1913–1994), American actor
 Pidge Browne (1929–1997), American baseball player
 George Browning, an AAU Men's Basketball All-American in the 1921–1922 season

Other uses:
 Ramona "Pidge" Contrares, a recurring character in Orange Is the New Black, an American web television series
 Pidge Gunderson, a character in Voltron: Legendary Defender, an American animated web television series
 Pigeon-hole messagebox or pidge, used for internal mail systems
 Pidge, a 1997 children's novel by Ann James

See also
 Pidgey (disambiguation)

Lists of people by nickname